Thomas B. Wilner (born 1944) is the managing partner of Shearman & Sterling's International Trade and Global Relations Practice.  Wilner has also represented the high-profile human rights cases of a dozen Kuwaiti citizens detained in the United States naval base at Guantanamo Bay, Cuba.

Wilner earned his law degree in 1969 from the University of Pennsylvania Law School.

Wilner has been admitted to the bar in a number of jurisdictions, including the US Supreme Court in 1975.

Career
The Washington Post published an op-ed by Wilner on January 1, 2008. He noted:

Wilner has been critical of the conditions under which the US holds Guantanamo detainees.

Wilner also reported that interrogators have warned Guantanamo captives that the Guantanamo attorneys were all Jewish, and they couldn't trust them.

On September 19, 2008 the Washington Post published a letter to the editor from Wilner in reply to a recent editorial on whether the Congress should pass legislation on how the Justice system should conduct captives' habeas corpus appeals. The United States Supreme Court's ruling in Boumediene v. Bush had overturned Congress's proscription on allowing captives access to the US justice system.

Senators Lindsey Graham and Joe Lieberman had introduced a bill "..to mandate the procedures the courts must follow in the habeas hearings for Guantanamo Bay detainees." The Washington Posts editorial had applauded the Senator's proposed bill. Wilner's letter expressed concern that the bill was unnecessary, and could:

References

1944 births
Living people
Guantanamo Bay attorneys
University of Pennsylvania Law School alumni